Acts and Epistles of the Apostles (the "Apostle"), completed in 1564, is the first Russian printed publication that has an exact date. It was published by Ivan Fyodorov (Ива́н Фёдоров).
It includes a short history of the origins of the first Moscow state printing house, written by the printer. The work on the "Apostle" began on 19 April 1563 and finished on 1 March 1564.

It was published at the Saint Onuphrius Monastery in Lviv, now Ukraine, and written in the liturgical language of the Russian Orthodox Church. Ivan Fyodorov (circa 1510-83) was one of the first printers in the East Slavic region, publishing liturgical works using movable type. The Apostle was widely used by the Orthodox Church and about 120 copies are known to exist, of which five are in the Vernadsky National Library of Ukraine.

References

 Acts and Epistles of the Apostles (1564) in The European Library 1st image

1564 books
East Slavic literature
Early printed Bibles